is a Japanese football player who currently plays for Vonds Ichihara.

Career
On 11 January 2019, Sugimoto joined Vonds Ichihara.

Career statistics
Updated to 23 February 2017.

References

External links
Profile at Tochigi SC

1987 births
Living people
Takushoku University alumni
Association football people from Nagano Prefecture
Japanese footballers
J2 League players
J3 League players
Tochigi SC players
Vonds Ichihara players
Association football midfielders